These are the official results of the Men's 110 metres Hurdles event at the 1993 IAAF World Championships in Stuttgart, Germany. There were a total of 47 participating athletes, with three semi-finals and six qualifying heats and the final held on Friday August 20, 1993. The gold medal was won by Colin Jackson of Great Britain with a world record time of 12.91 seconds.

Medalists

Final

Semi-finals
Held on Thursday 1993-08-19

Qualifying heats
Held on Thursday 1993-08-19

See also
 1990 Men's European Championships 110m Hurdles (Split)
 1991 Men's World Championships 110m Hurdles (Tokyo)
 1992 Men's Olympic 110m Hurdles (Barcelona)
 1994 Men's European Championships 110m Hurdles (Helsinki)
 1995 Men's World Championships 110m Hurdles (Gothenburg)

References
 Results

H
Sprint hurdles at the World Athletics Championships